John Roche may refer to:

John A. Roche (1844–1904), Chicago politician
John Roche (politician) (1848–1914), Irish politician
John Roche (detective) (1905–1940), Garda Síochána Detective
John Roche (actor) (1893–1952), American actor
John Roche (basketball) (born 1949), retired American professional basketball player
John Roche (martyr) (died 1588), Irishman, one of the English Martyrs executed in 1588, beatified in 1992
Johnny Roche (1932–1988), English footballer
Jack Roche (born 1953), Australian convicted on a charge of conspiring to destroy the Israeli Embassy in Canberra, Australia
Jack Roche (baseball) (1890–1983), Major League Baseball catcher
John Roche (bishop) (1584–1636), Irish Roman Catholic bishop
John Francis Roche, American serial killer, burglar, and rapist
John Roche (Canadian politician) (1834–1893), member of the Legislative Council of Quebec

See also
John Roach (disambiguation)